Badla  is a Bollywood film directed by Master Bhagwan. It was released in 1943.

Music
"Diwani Basegi Kya Teri Duniya" -
"Ghar Aaye Na More Saawaria" -
"Hanso Hanso Hasne Ke Din Aaye" -
"Kaisa Jawani Aayi" -
"Maashuk To Kya Milte" -
"Nazar Milate Hi Dil Me" -
"Pehle Hi Bekarar" -
"Sukh Ka Zamana Aaya" -
"Ye Ek Paise Me Takat Ki Puri Jholi Hai" -

References

External links
 

1943 films
1940s Hindi-language films
Films scored by C. Ramchandra
Indian black-and-white films